Rohan Handunpurage Pradeep Kumara (born 10 March 1975) is Sri Lankan athlete who competed in the Men's 400 meters at the 2004 Summer Olympic Games, and did not pass the first round.

Kumara finished 400m Round 1's fourth heat at a time of 46.20 seconds and was placed fifth. Though he lost at the Olympics, he has won events at other competitions in Asia.

He finished 3rd at the 2002 Asian Games with a time of 45.87 seconds.  His personal record is 45.25, set in 2000.

References

External links
 
 

1975 births
Living people
Sri Lankan male sprinters
Olympic athletes of Sri Lanka
Athletes (track and field) at the 2000 Summer Olympics
Athletes (track and field) at the 2004 Summer Olympics
Athletes (track and field) at the 2006 Commonwealth Games
Asian Games medalists in athletics (track and field)
Athletes (track and field) at the 1998 Asian Games
Athletes (track and field) at the 2002 Asian Games
Athletes (track and field) at the 2006 Asian Games
Asian Games bronze medalists for Sri Lanka
Medalists at the 2002 Asian Games
Medalists at the 2006 Asian Games
Commonwealth Games competitors for Sri Lanka